Gille Brigte of Angus is one of the earliest attested Mormaers of Angus. He was possibly a descendant of Dubacan of Angus.

Gille Brigte is recorded as a witness to a charter dating to 1150. He probably fathered both Adam and Gille Críst. He was dead by 1189, when his son Adam was the Mormaer.

Bibliography
 Roberts, John L., Lost Kingdoms: Celtic Scotland in the Middle Ages, (Edinburgh, 1997), pp. 53–4

12th-century deaths
People from Angus, Scotland
Year of birth unknown
12th-century mormaers
Mormaers of Angus